The term Realphilosophie was first introduced by Hegel. His Jenaer Realphilosophie of 1805/6 contains lectures "on the philosophy of nature and of the spirit". Hegel confronts the material philosophy of pure logic: Realphilosophie (Material philosophy) is thus thinking on empirical basis. In his Realphilosophie, Hegel concerns himself, among other things, with phenomena found in astronomy and biology. However, Realphilosophie also includes social and cultural phenomena. It covers both natural philosophy and cultural philosophy. According to the German science journalist Gábor Paál the concept is congruent with the idea of the Third Culture.

Sources

Georg Wilhelm Friedrich Hegel
Metaphilosophy